The Cedar Run District is a high school conference in the state of Virginia that  includes schools stretching from Prince William County.

Facts about the district
The Cedar Run District was established in 2001 to serve two purposes.  The first was to alleviate crowding in the Cardinal District, and the second purpose was to be a fourth district in the Northwestern Region, after two Southwest Virginia AAA Districts were consolidated into the Western Valley District.

District history
The charter members of the Cedar Run were Osbourn, Osbourn Park, Potomac, and Stonewall Jackson which all split from the Cardinal District.  As Prince William County grew, Battlefield High School of Haymarket opened and joined the district in 2004.  In 2005, Potomac was moved back to the Cardinal District, but the Cedar Run accepted Culpeper County High School from the Commonwealth District and Fauquier High School of the AA Northwestern District which expanded the district's geography considerably.  In 2007, the Cedar Run District welcomed two more members, Liberty High School of Fauquier County from the AA Northwestern District, and Loudoun Valley High School of the AAA National District.

In 2009–2010, Liberty High School, Fauquier High School, and Culpeper County High School will all move down to AA because of new schools opening up in their respective areas.  A preliminary plan had two additional Loudoun County schools joining the district with Heritage High School of Leesburg coming from Group AA, and Stone Bridge High School of Ashburn coming from the Liberty District and AAA Northern Region.  In addition, Osbourn Park is also expected to move back to the Cardinal District. However the preliminary plan was not passed and Stone Bridge was granted the right to stay in the Northern Region, Liberty District. Starting in the 2009/2010 school year the Cedar Run only had five members; Heritage, Loudoun Valley, Battlefield, Stonewall Jackson, and Osbourn.
The smallest member is Heritage with an enrollment of about 1,900 students and the largest is Battlefield with an enrollment of about 3,700.

In 2011–2012, Heritage-Leeseburg and Loudoun Valley returned to AA while be replaced in the Cedar Run District by Freedom-South Riding and Broad Run which moved up to AAA.

2017-2018 District champions

Fall Sports District Champions
Cheerleading: 
Boys Cross Country:
Girls Cross Country:
Field Hockey: 
Golf: 
Football: 
Volleyball: 

Winter Sports District Champions
Boys Basketball:
Girls Basketball: 
Girls Gymnastics: 
Boys Swimming: 
Girls Swimming: 
Boys Indoor Track: 
Girls Indoor Track: 
Wrestling:

Spring Sports District Champions
Baseball: 
Boys Lacrosse: 
Girls Lacrosse: 
Boys Soccer: Battlefield
Girls Soccer: Patriot
Softball: 
Boys Tennis:
Girls Tennis: 
Boys Track: 
Girls Track:

2020-2021 District champions

Fall Sports District Champions (Canceled Due To Pandemic)
Cheerleading: N/A
Boys Cross Country: N/A
Girls Cross Country: N/A
Field Hockey: N/A
Golf: N/A
Football: N/A
Volleyball: N/A

Winter Sports District Champions (Canceled Due To Pandemic)
Boys Basketball: N/A
Girls Basketball: N/A
Girls Gymnastics: N/A
Boys Swimming: N/A
Girls Swimming: N/A
Boys Indoor Track: N/A
Girls Indoor Track: N/A
Wrestling: N/A

Spring Sports District Champions
Baseball: Battlefield
Boys Lacrosse: Battlefield
Girls Lacrosse: Battlefield
Boys Soccer: Osbourn
Girls Soccer: Patriot
Softball: Osbourn Park
Boys Tennis:
Girls Tennis: 
Boys Track: 
Girls Track:

2021-2022 District champions

Fall Sports District Champions
Cheerleading: 
Boys Cross Country:
Girls Cross Country:
Field Hockey: 
Golf: 
Football: Battlefield
Volleyball: 

Winter Sports District Champions
Boys Basketball: Patriot
Girls Basketball: Osbourn Park
Girls Gymnastics: 
Boys Swimming: 
Girls Swimming: 
Boys Indoor Track: 
Girls Indoor Track: 
Wrestling:

Spring Sports District Champions
Baseball: 
Boys Lacrosse: 
Girls Lacrosse: 
Boys Soccer: Osbourn
Girls Soccer: John Champe
Softball: 
Boys Tennis:
Girls Tennis: 
Boys Track: 
Girls Track:

Membership history

Current members
Battlefield Bobcats of Haymarket
Freedom Eagles of South Riding
John Champe Knights of Aldie
Osbourn Eagles of Manassas
Osbourn Park Yellow Jackets of Manassas
Patriot Pioneers of Nokesville
Unity Reed Lions of Manassas
Gainesville Cardinals of Gainesville

Former members
Broad Run Spartans of Ashburn (2011-2013)
Culpeper Blue Devils of Culpeper (2005-2009)
Fauquier Falcons of Fauquier (2005-2009)
Freedom Eagles of South Riding (2011-2013)
Heritage Pride of Leesburg (2009-2011)
Liberty Eagles of Bealeton (2007-2009)
Loudoun Valley Vikings Purcellville (2007-2011)
Potomac Panthers of Dumfries (2001-2004)

Northern Virginia
Virginia High School League
Education in Prince William County, Virginia